Culebras District is one of five districts of the province Huarmey in Peru.

See also
Ancash Region
Huarmey Province

References

Districts of the Huarmey Province
Districts of the Ancash Region